Paraw Kukherd (from , in  is a water management system used.

The Paraw Kukherd Qanat structures and ruins are located in the Kukherd District, in Hormozgan Province. They are under the administration of the city of kukherd In Bastak County.

The Paraw Kukherd are an archaeological site of Sassanid architecture.

Technical features 
Qanats are constructed as a series of well-like vertical shafts, connected by gently sloping tunnels.  Qanats tap into subterranean water in a manner that efficiently delivers large quantities of water to the surface without need for pumping. The water drains relying on gravity, with the destination lower than the source, which is typically an upland aquifer. Qanats allow water to be transported over long distances in hot dry climates without losing a large proportion of the water to seepage and evaporation.

Impact of qanats on settlement patterns
A typical town or city in Iran and elsewhere where the qanat is used has more than one qanat. Fields and gardens are located both over the qanats a short distance before they emerge from the ground and after the surface outlet. Water from the qanats defines both the social regions in the city and the layout of the city.

The water is freshest, cleanest, and coolest in the upper reaches and more prosperous people live at the outlet or immediately upstream of the outlet. When the qanat is still below grade, the water is drawn to the surface via water wells or animal driven Persian wells. Private subterranean reservoirs could supply houses and buildings for domestic use and garden irrigation as well. Further, air flow from the qanat is used to cool an underground summer room (shabestan) found in many older houses and buildings.

See also 
Terenah 
Castle of Siba
Two domes of Kukherd
Sassanid family tree — of the Sasanian (Sassanid) dynasty

References 

 :ar: باراو كوخرد Arabic Wikipedias.
 :fa: پاراو کوخرد Persian Wikipedia.
	الكوخردى ، محمد ، بن يوسف، (كُوخِرد حَاضِرَة اِسلامِيةَ عَلي ضِفافِ نَهر مِهران) الطبعة الثالثة ،دبى: سنة 199۷ للميلاد **Mohammed Kookherdi (1997) Kookherd, an Islamic civil at Mehran river,  third edition: Dubai
	محمدیان، کوخری، محمد ، “ (به یاد کوخرد) “، ج1. ج2. چاپ اول، دبی: سال انتشار 2003 میلادی Mohammed Kookherdi Mohammadyan (2003), Beyade Kookherd, third edition : Dubai.
محمدیان، کوخردی ، محمد ،  «شهرستان بستک و بخش کوخرد»  ، ج۱. چاپ اول، دبی: سال انتشار ۲۰۰۵ میلادی Mohammed Kookherdi Mohammadyan (2005), Shahrestan  Bastak & Bakhshe Kookherd, First edition : Dubai.
عباسی ، قلی، مصطفی،  «بستک وجهانگیریه»، چاپ اول، تهران : ناشر: شرکت انتشارات جهان
   سلامى، بستكى، احمد.  (بستک در گذرگاه تاریخ)  ج2 چاپ اول، 1372 خورشيدى
 اطلس گیتاشناسی استان‌های ایران [Atlas Gitashenasi Ostanhai Iran] (Gitashenasi Province Atlas of Iran)
 درگاه فهرست آثار ملی ایران

External links 
 Kookherd website

Archaeological sites in Iran
Kukherd District
Bastak County
History of Hormozgan Province
Sasanian architecture
Monuments and memorials in Iran
Buildings and structures in Kukherd District
National works of Iran